Telescreens are devices that operate simultaneously as televisions, security cameras, and microphones. They are featured in George Orwell's dystopian 1949 novel Nineteen Eighty-Four as well as all film adaptations of the novel. In the novel and its adaptations, telescreens are used by the ruling Party in the totalitarian fictional state of Oceania to keep its subjects under constant surveillance, thus eliminating the chance of secret conspiracies against Oceania.

The concept of telescreen has been discussed as a metaphor or allegory for the loss of privacy in totalitarian states, as well as in the modern era in the context of Internet- or cellular-based devices that allow people to collect audiovisual data, often without their explicit will or knowledge.

Plot summary 

All members of the Inner Party (upper-class) and Outer Party (middle-class) have telescreens in their homes, but the proles (lower-class) are not typically monitored as they are unimportant to the Party. As later explained in Emmanuel Goldstein's book of which Winston Smith reads some excerpts, the Party does not feel threatened by the Proles, assuming that they would never rebel on their own, and therefore does not find a need to monitor their daily lives. Telescreens are also located throughout the workplaces of Party members, and more are positioned in busy public areas of London. It is unclear whether they can be used anywhere in Airstrip One (Britain) other than London; the novel at one point suggests technical limitations, forcing the Party to use hidden microphones and patrols for surveillance purposes in the countryside.

The character O'Brien claims that he, as a member of the Inner Party, can turn off his telescreen (although etiquette dictates only for half an hour at a time). While the programmes could no longer be seen or heard, the screen still functioned as a surveillance device, as after Winston is taken into the Ministry of Love, the audio of his meeting with O'Brien with the telescreen "off" is played back to Winston. Winston, a member of the Outer Party, can only turn the volume on his telescreen down.

The screens are monitored by the Thought Police. However, it is not clear how many screens are monitored at once, or what the precise criteria (if any) for monitoring a given screen are (although it is seen that during an exercise programme that Winston takes part in every morning, the instructor can see him). As the book notes:

Telescreen cameras do not have night vision technology, thus, they cannot monitor in the dark. This is compensated by the fact that their microphones are extremely sensitive, and they are said to pick up a heartbeat.

In addition to being surveillance devices, telescreens are also televisions. They broadcast propaganda about Oceania's military victories, economic production figures, spirited renditions of the national anthem to heighten patriotism, and Two Minutes Hate, which is a two-minute film of Emmanuel Goldstein's wishes for freedom of speech and press, which the citizens have been trained to disagree with through doublethink.

Though rationally aware that the telescreen is just the means by which a human being can see them or talk to them, the psychological effect of them is such that Orwell's characters often tend to personify the telescreen and think in terms of the telesceen speaking to them or watching them, rather than any of the individuals using it. Moreover, the telescreen's omnipresence in private and public life significantly affects the behaviour of the characters. Winston, for example, makes a regular effort to not arouse suspicion from anyone who may be watching him through the telescreen. The novel describes his setting "his features into the expression of quiet optimism which it was advisable to wear when facing the telescreen," and notes that when Winston turns his back to it, "...as he well knew, even a back can be revealing."

Origin 
Jeff Prucher listed the first use of the term, as "tele-screen", in a short story by F. Flagg, After Armageddon, in Wonder Stories in 1932. The word "telescreen" appears occasionally in the early science fiction novels of Robert Heinlein, published in the late 1940s - roughly concurrently with Orwell's book. As used by Heinlein, "telescreen" denoted simply what is now called "television", with none of the Orwellian sinister connotations. By the 1950s, the wide publicity of Orwell's book precluded further such usage.

Orwell's novel was written in 1947–1948. The telescreen he created was based on some already existing technologies (see history of television), although the first surveillance cameras began to be sold in the United States only in 1949, shortly after the publication of the novel.

According to the Canadian literary scholar Thomas Dilworth, Orwell, inventing telescreens, might have been inspired by the film Modern Times directed by Charlie Chaplin, where a device receiving and receiving an audiovisual signal was shown. Dilworth noted that the theme of using subliminal messaging through the telescreen is also reminiscent of the theme of using hypnopedia on children in Aldous Huxley's Brave New World.

Another inspiration for the telescreen could come from the 19th-century idea of a panopticon - a prison whose design would allow the prison guards to observe all prisoners, with the inmates not knowing if and when they are being watched.

Analysis 
The telescreen is basically the only significant futuristic technological gadget in Orwell's book. Telescreens also appear in later works, such as the film Equilibrium by Kurt Wimmer (from 2002), where their use is no longer a technological novelty, but rather a "retro-quote" referring to Orwell's work.

Telescreens have been described as an allegory or metaphor for informers in communist countries or, more broadly, of the loss of privacy in totalitarian states. Nowadays, telescreens are compared to, among others, a television surveillance system, TV sets controlled by voice commands that collect data (both actual commands and private conversations) for analysis on servers, modern cellphones, and other devices that allow people to collect audiovisual data, including the Internet itself.

Peter Huber notes that for Orwell, electronic media is ugly, oppressive and mind-numbing, and that Orwell believed that they would significantly empower those in power who would be given more and more opportunities to spy on citizens. Huber, however, consider Orwell's argument to be wrong, pointing out that progress in the field of communication technology, including the Internet, is progress towards the technology of freedom, and the level of freedom of society increases with the development and popularity of these technologies. Similarly, Richard A. Posner writes that Orwell approached technology too pessimistically - in his book, the television (telescreen) is a tool for spying and indoctrination, while in fact this medium became an educational tool reducing the elite's monopoly of power.

On the other hand, Lawrence Lessig gives Orwell some credence, arguing that a fictitious telescreen is less intrusive than today's Internet; similarly, David Brin writes that the process of privacy erosion cannot be stopped, but it can be counterbalanced by monitoring monitors on a double telescreen basis, where those who monitor us can also be monitored.

See also
Mass surveillance
Propaganda
Panopticon
Talking CCTV

References

Fictional elements introduced in 1949
Nineteen Eighty-Four
Fictional technology